Michael Björn Blakstad FRSA (born 18 April 1940) is a television producer and a former Editor of Tomorrow's World on the BBC.

Early life
He was born in Penang in Malaya. He was initially educated in Australia, then North Yorkshire, where he lived. He was an only child. He attended Oriel College, Oxford, where he gained a BA in Classics (Class III).

Career

BBC
He joined the BBC in 1963. In 1967 he directed the One Pair Of Eyes episode "Stay Baby Stay". He became the series editor of Tomorrow's World in 1974, during what was the heyday of the series, as electronics became part of the working world.Children in Crossfire which he wrote and produced, won an award in 1974 at the Nyon International Documentary Film Festival, now called the Visions du Réel. He was also series editor of The Burke Special, and The Risk Business, about British industry. At Tomorrow's World, he fell out with the long-established presenter Raymond Baxter, who then left the programme.

ITV
From 1969-71 he was a producer with Yorkshire Television. From 1981-84 he was director of programmes at Television South (TVS, the franchise from 1982–92), the franchise for the current ITV Meridian (South) region.

Personal life
He married in 1965. His wife came from Cotescue Park, and they live in East Meon. He has a son and twin daughters.

References

External links
 
 BFI

1940 births
Alumni of Oriel College, Oxford
BBC science
BBC television producers
ITV people
Mass media in Hampshire
People from East Meon
People from Penang
Living people
British expatriates in Malaysia
British expatriates in Australia